Oteake Conservation Park is a protected area in the Waitaki District and Otago Region of New Zealand's South Island.

The park is managed by the New Zealand Department of Conservation.

Geography

It is located south of Omarama, Otematata and Lake Benmore.

History

The park was established in 2010.

References

Parks in Otago
Waitaki District
2010 establishments in New Zealand
Protected areas established in 2010